NFK, NFk, or Nfk may refer to:

 Eritrean nakfa, the currency of Eritrea
 Necip Fazıl Kısakürek (1904-1983), Turkish poet, novelist, playwright, and Islamist ideologue known by his initials NFK
 New Farakka Junction railway station, in West Bengal, India
 New Forum for the Restoration of Democracy–Kenya, a former political party
 Nordland Fylkeskommune, the County Council of Nordland
 Norfolk Island
 Norfolk, UK county
 Norfolk dialect
 Norfolk, Virginia, US city
 Norfolk station (Amtrak), its intercity train station
 North fork, used to disambiguate otherwise identically named tributaries of a river